Bintang Medan Football Club, commonly referred to as Bintang Medan F.C. or Medan Bintang F.C., or simply Bintang Medan, was an Indonesian football club based in Medan, North Sumatra. This team plays in the Liga Primer Indonesia. This is the special team prepared for the Liga Primer Indonesia (LPI) event by the PSMS Medan club management.

Supporters
Bintang Medan's supporters call themselves "Brigade of Medan Bintang (BOMB)" and "SMeCK Hooligan", who also become PSMS Medan's supporters.

Kit supplier
Uno (2011– )

See also
PSMS Medan

References

External links
Bintang Medan at Liga_Primer.co.id 
Bintang Medan at Futbol24.com

Defunct football clubs in Indonesia
Football clubs in Indonesia
Association football clubs established in 2010
2010 establishments in Indonesia
Association football clubs disestablished in 2011
2011 disestablishments in Indonesia